The phurba (alternate transliterations: phurpa, phurbu, purbha, or phurpu) or kīla  (Sanskrit Devanagari: कील; IAST: kīla) is a three-sided peg, stake, knife, or nail-like ritual implement traditionally associated with Indo-Tibetan Buddhism, Bön, and Indian Vedic traditions.

The phurba is associated with the practice of the meditational deity (Sanskrit ishtadevata, Tibetan yidam) Vajrakīlaya (Tibetan Dorje Phurba) or  Vajrakīla (वज्रकील).

Etymology
Most of what is known of the Indian kīla lore has come by way of Tibetan culture. Scholars such as F. A. Bischoff, Charles Hartman and Martin Boord have shown that the Tibetan literature widely asserts that the Sanskrit for their term phurba is kīlaya (with or without the long i). However, as Boord describes it, 

Mayer (1996) contests Boord's assertion, pointing out that eminent Sanskritists such as Sakya Pandita employed Vajrakīlaya. Further, he argues:

Fabrication and components

The fabrication of phurba is quite diverse. Having pommel, handle, and blade, phurba are often segmented into suites of triunes on both the horizontal and vertical axes, though there are notable exceptions. This compositional arrangement highlights the numerological importance and spiritual energy of the integers three and nine. Phurba may be constituted and constructed of different materials and material components, such as wood, metal, clay, bone, gems, horn or crystal.

Like the majority of traditional Tibetan metal instruments, the phurba is often made from brass and iron (terrestrial and/or meteoric iron.  'Thokcha' means "sky-iron" in Tibetan and denote tektites and meteorites which are often high in iron content. Meteoric iron was highly prized throughout the Himalaya where it was included in sophisticated polymetallic alloys such as Panchaloha for ritual implements. The pommel of the phurba often bears three faces of Vajrakīla, one joyful, one peaceful, one wrathful, but may bear the umbrella of the ashtamangala or mushroom cap, Yidam (like Hayagriva) , snow lion, or stupa, among other possibilities. The handle is often of a vajra, weaving or knotwork design. The handle generally has a triune form as is common to the pommel and blade. The blade is usually composed of three triangular facets or faces, meeting at the tip. These represent, respectively, the blade's power to transform the negative energies known as the "three poisons" or "root poisons" (Sanskrit: mula klesha) of attachment/craving/desire, delusion/ignorance/misconception, and aversion/fear/hate.

Ritual usage
Cantwell and Mayer (2008) have studied a number of texts recovered from the cache of the Dunhuang manuscripts that discuss the phurba and its ritual usage.

The phurba is one of many iconographic representations of divine symbolic attributes (Tibetan: phyag mtshan) of Vajrayana and Hindu deities. When consecrated and bound for usage, Phurba are a nirmanakaya manifestation of Vajrakīlaya.

Chandra, et al. in their dictionary entry 'korkor' "coiled" (English) relates that the text titled the 'Vaidūry Ngonpo' has the passage: ཐག་བ་ཕུར་བ་ལ་ཀོར་ཀོར་བྱམ "a string was wound round the (exorcist's) dagger [phurba]."

One of the principal methods of working with the phurba and to actualize its essence-quality is to pierce the earth with it;  sheath it; or as is common with Himalayan shamanic traditions, to penetrate it vertically, point down into a basket, bowl or cache of rice (or other soft grain if the phurba is wooden). The terms employed for the deity and the tool are interchangeable in Western scholarship. In the Himalayan shamanic tradition, the phurba may be considered as axis mundi. Müller-Ebelling, et al. affirm that for the majority of Nepalese shaman, the phurba is cognate with the world tree, either in their visualisations or in initiatory rites or other rituals.

The phurba is used as a ritual implement to signify stability on a prayer ground during ceremonies, and only those initiated in its use, or otherwise empowered, may wield it. The energy of the phurba is fierce, wrathful, piercing, affixing, transfixing. The phurba affixes the elemental process of 'space' (Sanskrit: ākāśa) to the Earth, thereby establishing an energetic continuum. Phurba, particularly those that are wooden are for shamanic healing, harmonizing and energy work and often have two nāgas (Sanskrit for snake, serpent and/or dragon, also refers to a class of supernatural entities or deities) entwined on the blade. Phurba often also bear the ashtamangala, swastika, sauwastika and/or other Himalayan, Tantric or Hindu iconography or motifs.

The phurba as an iconographical implement is also directly related to Vajrakilaya, a wrathful deity of Tibetan Buddhism who is often seen with his consort Diptacakra (Tib. 'khor lo rgyas 'debs ma). He is embodied in the phurba as a means of destroying (in the sense of finalising and then freeing) violence, hatred, and aggression by tying them to the blade of the phurba and then transmuting them with its tip. The pommel may be employed in blessings. It is therefore that the phurba is not a physical weapon, but a spiritual implement, and should be regarded as such.

As Müller-Ebeling, et al. state:

As Beer states:

Cultural context
To work with the spirits and deities of the earth, land and place, people of India, the Himalayas and the Mongolian Steppe pegged, nailed and/or pinned down the land. The nailing of the phurba is comparable to the idea of breaking the earth (turning the sod) in other traditions and the rite of laying the foundation stone. It is an ancient shamanic idea that has common currency throughout the region; it is prevalent in the Bön tradition and is also evident in the Vajrayana tradition. According to shamanic folklore current throughout the region, "...the mountains were giant pegs that kept the Earth in place and prevented it from moving." Mountains such as Amnye Machen, according to folklore were held to have been brought from other lands just for this purpose.

Kerrigan, et al., state that:

Traditions such as that of the phurba may be considered a human cultural universal in light of foundation stone rites and other comparable rites documented in the disciplines of anthropology and ethnography; e.g., turning of the soil as a placation and votive offering to spirits of place and to preparation of the land as a rite to ensure fertility and bountiful yield.

Traditional lineage usage
In the Kathmandu Valley, the phurba is still in usage by shamans, magicians, tantrikas and lamas of different ethnic backgrounds. The phurba is used particularly intensively by the Tamang, Gurung and Newar peoples. The phurba is also employed by the Tibetans native to Nepal (the Bhotyas), the Sherpas, and the Tibetans living in Dharamasala. The phurba is also used in religious rituals in Bhutan, and can most often be found in the temples and altars of Bhutan.

Müller-Ebelling, et al., chart the difference of the traditions between the jhankris and the gubajus:

A Bhairab kīla is an important healing tool of the tantric Newari gubajus. As Müller-Ebelling, et al. state:

Müller-Ebelling, et al. interviewed Mohan Rai, a shaman from the border area of Nepal and Bhutan and belongs to the Mongolian people of the Rai and/or Kirati. Mohan Rai is the founder of the Shamanistic Studies and Research Centre in Kathmandu, Nepal. In the interview Rai says:

See also

Notes

Citations

References

Further reading
 

Blade weapons
Buddhist ritual implements
Ceremonial knives
Ritual weapons
Tibetan Buddhist ritual implements
Weapons in Buddhist mythology